Mount Henry is a  mountain summit located in the Sierra Nevada mountain range, in Fresno County of northern California, United States. The John Muir Trail passes to the northeast, providing an approach option.

Etymology
The peak's name was applied in 1904 by Joseph Nisbet LeConte to honor Joseph Henry (1797–1878), an eminent American scientist noted for his investigations of electromagnetism, and who served as the first Secretary of the Smithsonian Institution. This geographical feature's name has been officially adopted by the United States Board on Geographic Names.

Climate
According to the Köppen climate classification system, Mount Henry is located in an alpine climate zone. Most weather fronts originate in the Pacific Ocean, and travel east toward the Sierra Nevada mountains. As fronts approach, they are forced upward by the peaks, causing them to drop their moisture in the form of rain or snowfall onto the range (orographic lift). Precipitation runoff from this mountain drains into the San Joaquin River watershed.

Climbing
It is unknown when, or by whom, the first ascent was made.

Established climbing routes:

 Northeast ridge –  – July 7, 1939, by a Sierra Club party led by David Brower
 Southwest slope – class 2 – August 14, 1939, by a party of eight
 West slope – class 2 – August 29, 1940, by Bob Helliwell and Alden Bryant
 North ridge – class 3 – July 10, 1951 by Art Reyman

See also

 List of mountain peaks of California

References

External links

 Weather forecast: National Weather Service

Mountains of Fresno County, California
Mountains of Kings Canyon National Park
North American 3000 m summits
Mountains of Northern California
Sierra Nevada (United States)
Mountains of the John Muir Wilderness
Sierra National Forest